Mexican musician Raymix has released two studio album, one extended play (EP), 3 compilation EPs, 19 singles (including eight collaborations and guest appearances). Raymix started his music career in the early 2010s when he joined a trance project called Light & Wave with two other Mexican musicians. Around 2015, Raymix gained popularity thanks to his independently released song "Oye Mujer", which he wrote while he was doing a NASA educative internship. Raymix signed with Universal Music Latin Entertainment and in 2018 he released his debut album Oye Mujer, with the title song being  as his debut commercial single and also was remixed and launched as a duet with Colombian singer Juanes. The song topped the Billboard Regional Mexican Airplay and Tropical Airplay charts. Additionally, it reached number 6 on the Bubbling Under Hot 100 chart and has been certified  (Latin) by the Recording Industry Association of America (RIAA) and Diamond + 2× Platinum by the Asociación Mexicana de Productores de Fonogramas y Videogramas (AMPROFON).

Since then, Raymix has released multiple charting singles, including "Dónde Estarás", "Tú Eres la Razón", "Tú y Yo" (as a duet with Paulina Rubio) and "Llámame".

Studio albums

Extended plays

Singles

References

Discographies of Mexican artists
Latin pop music discographies
Tropical music discographies
Regional Mexican music discographies